Koot may refer to:

People
Koot Hoomi, one of the Mahatmas that inspired the founding of the Theosophical Society
Koot (surname), Dutch surname
Half of the Dutch comedy duo Koot en Bie (Kees van Kooten)

Places
Al Koot Fort, a historical military fortress in Qatar
Koot Sheikh, a village in southwest Iran
Korey Koot, a town in northeast Pakistan

Language
Koot (language), a made up language

Other
KOOT, a former educational radio station in New Mexico, United States

See also
Aniek van Koot (born 1990), Dutch wheelchair tennis player
Coot (disambiguation)